Chantal Boonacker (born 23 March 1977 - 29 January 2021) was a Dutch Paralympic swimmer. She represented the Netherlands at the Summer Paralympics in 2000, 2004 and 2008.

At the 2004 Summer Paralympics held in Athens, Greece, she won the bronze medal in the women's 100 metre backstroke S8 event and at the 2008 Summer Paralympics held in Beijing, China, she won the bronze medal in the women's 100 metre backstroke S7 event.

References

External links 
 

1977 births
2021 deaths
Place of birth missing
Dutch female backstroke swimmers
Swimmers at the 2000 Summer Paralympics
Swimmers at the 2004 Summer Paralympics
Swimmers at the 2008 Summer Paralympics
Paralympic bronze medalists for the Netherlands
Paralympic medalists in swimming
S7-classified Paralympic swimmers
Paralympic swimmers of the Netherlands
Medalists at the 2004 Summer Paralympics
Medalists at the 2008 Summer Paralympics
21st-century Dutch women